Acrothamnus suaveolens is a shrub in the family Ericaceae. It is found in alpine and sub-alpine areas of the Indomalayan and Australasian realms, including Mount Kinabalu in Borneo, Davao and Mount Apo on Mindanao, the Bantaeng mountains in southwestern Sulawesi, and Mount Fetin on Timor. It is also found in sub-alpine grasslands and shrublands on Mount Wilhelm in New Guinea.

References

Flora of Malesia
Epacridoideae